"I'm Good, I'm Gone" is a song by Swedish singer Lykke Li from her debut studio album, Youth Novels (2008). Produced by Björn Yttling and co-produced by Lasse Mårtén, it was released on 14 January 2008 as the album's second single. It was featured in the video game FIFA 09, while the Black Kids remix of the song was included on the soundtrack to the 2009 horror film Sorority Row. Rolling Stone listed it at number 34 on its list of the 100 Best Singles of 2008.

Track listings
Swedish and UK CD single / Swedish digital single
"I'm Good, I'm Gone" – 3:10
"I Don't Mind (Jump on It)" – 4:13

Swedish limited-edition 7-inch single
A. "I'm Good, I'm Gone" – 3:11
B. "I Don't Mind (Jump on It)" – 4:13

UK digital single
"I'm Good, I'm Gone" – 3:09
"I'm Good, I'm Gone" (Metronomy Remix) – 5:15
"I'm Good, I'm Gone" (Black Kids Remix) – 3:23

UK 7-inch single
A. "I'm Good, I'm Gone" – 3:03
B. "I'm Good, I'm Gone" (Metronomy Remix) – 5:05

UK 12-inch single
A1. "I'm Good, I'm Gone" (Metronomy Remix) – 5:15
A2. "I'm Good, I'm Gone" (Black Kids Remix) – 3:23
B1. "I'm Good, I'm Gone" (Five Guys & A Dog Remix)

Danish promotional CD single
"I'm Good, I'm Gone" (Fred Falke Vocal) – 7:31
"I'm Good, I'm Gone" (Fred Falke Instrumental) – 7:32
"I'm Good, I'm Gone" (Black Kids Remix) – 3:25
"I'm Good, I'm Gone" (Metronomy Vocal) – 5:21
"I'm Good, I'm Gone" (Metronomy Instrumental) – 5:18

Credits and personnel
Credits adapted from the liner notes of Youth Novels.

 Lykke Li – vocals
 Björn Yttling – production, recording, mixing, electric bass, piano, percussion, synthesizers, acoustic guitar, celeste
 Lasse Mårtén – co-production, recording, additional recordings, mixing
 Janne Hansson – recording
 Matt Azzarto – additional recordings
 Bill Emmons – additional recordings
 Tommy Andersson – engineering assistance
 Tom Gloady – engineering assistance
 Neil Lipuma – engineering assistance
 Henrik Jonsson – mastering
 Lars Skoglund – drums, percussion
 John Eriksson – percussion
 Mapei – backing vocals
 Lissy Trullie – backing vocals

Charts

Release history

References

External links
 

2008 singles
2008 songs
Atlantic Records singles
Lykke Li songs
Songs written by Björn Yttling
Songs written by Lykke Li